The Nokia 8910 is a mobile phone released in 2002 by Nokia. Part of the luxury 8xxx series, it was introduced as a successor of the Nokia 8850/8890. It has a white backlight, and features Bluetooth connectivity.

It was succeeded by the Nokia 8910i, which was released in 2003.

See also
Vertu

References

Mobile phones introduced in 2002
8910
Mobile phones with infrared transmitter
Slider phones